Dichaea is a genus of plants in family Orchidaceae. It contains about 100 species native to tropical America.

References

External links 
 
 

 
Orchids of South America
Zygopetalinae genera